Johnny Logan may refer to:

Johnny Logan (baseball) (1926–2013), American baseball player
Johnny Logan (basketball) (1921–1977), American basketball player
Johnny Logan (singer) (born 1954), Australian-born Irish singer
 Johnny "Guitar" Logan, main character in the film Johnny Guitar

See also
John Logan (disambiguation)
Jonny Logan, an Italian humorous comic strip series